is a professional Japanese baseball player. He plays pitcher for the Tokyo Yakult Swallows.

On February 27, 2019, he was selected for Japan national baseball team at the 2019 exhibition games against Mexico.

References

External links

 NPB.com

1999 births
Living people
Baseball people from Saga Prefecture
Japanese baseball players
Nippon Professional Baseball pitchers
Tokyo Yakult Swallows players